Malatya Spor Kulübü is a Turkish sports club based in Malatya, mainly concentrated on football. Previously their colors were yellow and black (prior to 1984). They played in First League for 11 seasons. They are the first team located in Eastern Anatolia which qualified for a European cup, 2003–04 UEFA Cup. They relegated to amateur level after matches played on 31 March 2011. They finally relegated to Malatya First Amateur League after five successive relegation due to financial difficulties.

League participations 
Turkish Super League: 1984–90, 2001–06
TFF First League: 1967–68, 1973–77, 1980–84, 1990–01, 2006–09
TFF Second League: 1968–73, 1977–80, 2009–10
TFF Third League: 2010–11
Turkish Regional Amateur League: 2011–12
Amatör Futbol Ligleri: 2012–

European Cups 

UEFA Cup/Europa League:

External links 
Malatyaspor's official web site 

 
Sport in Malatya
Football clubs in Turkey
Association football clubs established in 1966
1966 establishments in Turkey
Süper Lig clubs